The Mission is a 1986 British period drama film about the experiences of a Jesuit missionary in 18th-century South America. Directed by Roland Joffé and written by Robert Bolt, the film stars Robert De Niro, Jeremy Irons, Ray McAnally, Aidan Quinn, Cherie Lunghi, and Liam Neeson.

It won the Cannes Film Festival Palme d'Or and the Academy Award for Best Cinematography. In April 2007, it was elected number one on the Church Times Top 50 Religious Films list. Furthermore, it is one of fifteen films listed in the category "Religion" on the Vatican film list. The music, scored by Italian composer Ennio Morricone, ranked 1st on the Australian Broadcasting Corporation's (ABC) Classic 100 Music in the Movies.

Plot
In the 1750s, Spanish Jesuit priest Father Gabriel enters the northeastern Argentina and eastern Paraguayan jungle to build a mission station and convert a Guaraní community to Christianity. The Guaraní are not initially receptive to Christianity or outsiders in general and, when Gabriel sends a priest to make contact with them, they tie the priest to a wooden cross and send him to his death over the Iguazu Falls. Father Gabriel himself then travels to the falls, climbs to the top and, in an attempt to make a connection with them through music, plays his oboe. One of the Guaraní warriors, seeing that the stranger and his music are European, breaks the oboe, throws it down into the water, and stalks off. Father Gabriel does not react, however, and the remaining Guaraní (who were captivated by the music) allow him to live and take him to their village.

Mercenary and slaver Rodrigo Mendoza makes his living kidnapping natives such as the Guaraní community and selling them to nearby plantations, including the plantation of the Spanish Governor Don Cabeza. After returning from another kidnapping trip, his assumed fiancée, Carlotta, confesses to Mendoza that she is actually in love with his younger half-brother Felipe. Mendoza later finds them in bed together and, in a fit of rage, kills Felipe in a duel. Although he is acquitted of the killing of Felipe, Mendoza spirals into depression. Father Gabriel visits and challenges Mendoza to undertake a suitable penance. Mendoza accompanies the Jesuits on their return journey, dragging a heavy bundle containing his armour and sword. After initially tense moments upon reaching the outskirts of the natives' territory, since they recognize their former persecutor, the natives soon come to forgive a tearful Mendoza and cut away his heavy bundle.

Father Gabriel's mission is depicted as a place of sanctuary and education for the Guaraní. Moved by the Guaraní's acceptance, Mendoza wishes to help at the mission and Father Gabriel gives him a Bible. In time, Mendoza takes vows and becomes a Jesuit under Father Gabriel and his colleague, Father John.

With the protection offered to Missions under Spanish law, the Jesuit missions have been safe. However, the Treaty of Madrid (1750) reapportioned South American land on which the Jesuit missions were located, transferring the area to the Portuguese, who allowed slavery. The Portuguese colonials seek to enslave the natives and, as the independent Jesuit missions might impede this, Papal emissary Cardinal Altamirano, a former Jesuit priest, is sent from the Vatican to survey the missions and decide which, if any, should be allowed to remain.

Under pressure from both Cabeza and Portuguese representative Hontar, Cardinal Altamirano is forced to choose between two evils. If he rules in favour of the colonists, the indigenous peoples will become enslaved; if he rules in favour of the missions, the entire Jesuit Order may be condemned by the Portuguese and the European Catholic Church could fracture. Altamirano visits the missions and is amazed at their industry and success, both in converting the Indians and, in some cases, economically. At Father Gabriel's mission of San Carlos, he tries to explain the reasons behind closing the missions and instructs the Guaraní that they must leave, because "it is God's will." The Guaraní question the validity of his claim and argue God's will was to settle and develop the mission. Father Gabriel and Mendoza, under threat of excommunication, state their intention to defend the mission alongside the Guaraní if the plantation owners and colonists attack. They are, however, divided on how to do this, and they debate how to respond to the impending military attack. Father Gabriel believes that violence is a direct crime against God. Mendoza, however, decides to break his vows by militarily defending the Mission. Against Father Gabriel's wishes, he teaches the natives the European art of war and, once more, takes up his sword.

When a joint Portuguese and Spanish force attacks, the mission is initially defended by Mendoza, John, and the Guaraní. Although they put up a good fight, they are no match for the military force. Father John is killed while luring the Portuguese commander into a trap. Mendoza is shot and fatally wounded after the soldiers destroy a trap, allowing them to enter the village. Upon seeing the church service at the mission village, the soldiers become reluctant to fire. When the soldiers enter the mission village, they encounter the singing of Father Gabriel and the Guaraní women and children who march in a religious procession. Father Gabriel leads, carrying a monstrance with the Blessed Sacrament. Ignoring this, the Spanish commander orders the attack. Father Gabriel, the rest of the priests and most of the Guaraní, including women and children, are systematically gunned down. After Father Gabriel is shot, a man picks up the Blessed Sacrament and continues leading the procession. Only a handful of children escape into the jungle.

In a final exchange between Cardinal Altamirano and Hontar, Hontar laments, saying what has happened was unfortunate but inevitable: "We must work in the world; the world is thus." Altamirano rejoins: "No, thus have we made the world. Thus have I made it." Days later, a canoe of young children return to the scene of the Mission massacre and salvage a few belongings. They set off up the river, going deeper into the jungle, with the thought that the events will remain in their memories. A final title declares that many priests have continued to fight for the rights of indigenous people into the present day. The text of John 1:5 is displayed: "The light shineth in the darkness, and the darkness hath not overcome it."

Cast

Historical basis

The Mission is based on events surrounding the Treaty of Madrid in 1750, in which Spain ceded part of Jesuit Paraguay to Portugal. A significant subtext is the impending suppression of the Jesuits, of which Father Gabriel is warned by the film's narrator, Cardinal Altamirano, who was once himself a Jesuit. Altamirano, speaking in hindsight in 1758, corresponds to the actual Andalusian Jesuit Father Luis Altamirano, who was sent by Jesuit Superior General Ignacio Visconti to Paraguay in 1752 to transfer territory from Spain to Portugal. He oversaw the transfer of seven missions south and east of the Río Uruguay, that had been settled by Guaraní and Jesuits in the 17th century. As compensation, Spain promised each mission 4,000 pesos, or fewer than 1 peso for each of the approximately 30,000 Guaraní of the seven missions, while the cultivated lands, livestock, and buildings were estimated to be worth 7–16 million pesos. The film's climax is the Guaraní War of 1754–1756, during which historical Guaraní defended their homes against Spanish-Portuguese forces implementing the Treaty of Madrid. For the film, a re-creation was made of one of the seven missions, São Miguel das Missões.

Father Gabriel's character is loosely based on the life of Paraguayan saint and Jesuit Roque González de Santa Cruz. The story is taken from the book The Lost Cities of Paraguay by Father C. J. McNaspy, S.J., who was also a consultant on the film.

The waterfall setting of the film suggests the combination of these events with the story of older missions, founded between 1610–1630 on the Paranapanema River above the Guaíra Falls, from which Paulista slave raids forced Guaraní and Jesuits to flee in 1631. The battle at the end of the film evokes the eight-day Battle of Mbororé in 1641, a battle fought on land as well as in boats on rivers, in which the Jesuit-organised, firearm-equipped Guaraní forces stopped the Paulista raiders.

Historical inaccuracies
The historical Altamirano was not a cardinal sent by the Pope, but an emissary sent by the Superior General of the Society of Jesus, Ignacio Visconti, to preserve the Jesuits in Europe in the face of attacks in Spain and Portugal.

Historical critiques
Scholar James Schofield Saeger has many objections to the portrayal of the Guaraní in the movie. The film in his opinion is a "white European distortion of Native American reality." Indians are treated as "mission furniture." The film asserts that the Guaraní accepted Christianity immediately although in reality native religious beliefs persisted for  several generations. The film also glosses over the frequent resistance by Guaraní to Jesuit authority as witnessed by several revolts and the refusal of many Guaraní to live in the missions. The movie also portrays Jesuit-led armed resistance to Spanish attempts to force the missions to move in the 1750s.  In reality the revolt was carried out only by the Guaraní after the Jesuits had turned over control of the missions to the colonial governments of Spain and Portugal. A Jesuit ordered that the missions be abandoned and also ordered the Guaraní to cease making weapons. The Guaraní defied him and embarked on an armed, but ultimately unsuccessful revolt. However, several Jesuits remained in the missions with the Guaraní during their suppression by the colonials and the Spanish and Portuguese accused them of inciting the Guaraní to resist.

Filming locations
The film was mostly filmed in Colombia, Argentina, Brazil and Paraguay. The tunnels of Fort Amherst in Kent were used as part of the monastery where Mendoza (Robert De Niro) sequesters himself after murdering his brother.

Soundtrack

The soundtrack for The Mission was written by Ennio Morricone. Beginning with a liturgical piece ("On Earth as It Is in Heaven") which becomes the 'Spanish' theme, it moves quickly to the 'Guaraní' theme, which is written in a heavily native style and uses several indigenous instruments. Later, Morricone defines The Mission theme as a duet between the 'Spanish' and "Guaraní" themes. The soundtrack was recorded at CTS Lansdowne Studios in London.

Other themes throughout the movie include the 'Penance', 'Conquest', and 'Ave Maria Guaraní' themes. In the latter, a large choir of indigenous people sing a rendition of the "Ave Maria".

Reception

Box office
The film grossed $17.2 million at the US and international box office against a budget of £16.5 million, which at the time was the US equivalent of $25.4 million, making this film a commercial flop.

Goldcrest Films invested £15,130,000 in the film and received £12,250,000 in returns, netting Goldcrest a £2,880,000 loss.

Critical
The Mission received mixed to positive reviews from critics. The review aggregator Rotten Tomatoes reported that 64% of critics have given the film a positive review based on 28 reviews, with an average rating of 6.3/10. The site's critics consensus reads, "The Mission is a well-meaning epic given delicate heft by its sumptuous visuals and a standout score by Ennio Morricone, but its staid presentation never stirs an emotional investment in its characters." On Metacritic, the film has a weighted average score of 55 out of 100 based on 18 critic reviews, indicating "mixed or average reviews".

Awards and honours

American Film Institute
 2005: AFI's 100 Years of Film Scores – #23

See also
Iguazu Falls

References

External links

The Mission at the Arts & Faith Top100 Spiritually Significant Films list

1986 films
Films directed by Roland Joffé
Films set in Brazil
Films set in Paraguay
Films set in jungles
Palme d'Or winners
Films about Catholicism
British historical films
1980s historical films
Goldcrest Films films
1980s English-language films
Guaraní-language films
Films set in the 1750s
1980s Spanish-language films
Latin-language films
Society of Jesus
Films about Christianity
Films with screenplays by Robert Bolt
Films about Catholic priests
Films whose cinematographer won the Best Cinematography Academy Award
Films shot in Foz do Iguaçu
Films shot in Colombia
Films set in South America
British epic films
Films about hunter-gatherers
Indigenous cinema in Latin America
Films scored by Ennio Morricone
Films produced by David Puttnam
Fratricide in fiction
Christian missionaries in South America
Spanish missions in South America
Warner Bros. films
1980s British films